François Louis Julien Simon Héron (1746-1796) was a French revolutionary and an agent of the Committee of General Security.

Biography 
Louis Heron was the son of Jean Heron (a tobacco farmer) and Judith Costar. He married Modeste-Anne-Jeanne Desbois, daughter of Étienne-Benoist Desbois and Modeste-Charlotte Helvant, on August 12, 1777 in Cancale.

He became quartermaster to the Count of Artois before serving as a naval officer from 1778 to 1784.

Lieutenant of the Sartine in 1782 (owned by Joseph-Denis Goguet, shipowner in La Rochelle), he sailed in May 1784 to Havana, with the mission of buying a million piastres on behalf of Minister Calonne, this million corresponding to the debt of one million piastres owed by the Spanish government to Cabarrus and Lalanne of Madrid in September 1782.

When he got back to France after the seven-month trip, the minister refused to grant him the compensation to which he thought he was entitled.

During the French Revolution, he befriends Jean-Paul Marat and participates to the most defining events, including the Insurrection of 10 August 1792 where he commanded the Marseille battalion. According to Gabriel Jérôme Sénar, Héron also partook to the September Massacres.

References 
Louis Blanc, Histoire de la Révolution française, tome 2, Librairie internationale, 1869, p. 603-604 [archive]
H. Sueur et R., « Héron (Louis-Julien-Simon) », in Ferdinand Hoefer (dir.), Nouvelle biographie générale depuis les temps les plus reculés jusqu'à nos jours, Paris, Firmin Didot frères, 1858, tome XXIV, p. 449-450 [archive].
« Héron (François) », dans Biographie universelle, ancienne et moderne, Louis-Gabriel Michaud, 1857, tome 19, p. 315-316 [archive]
« Héron (François) », dans Biographie universelle ou Dictionnaire de tous les hommes qui se sont fait remarquer par leurs écrits, leurs actions, leurs talents, leurs vertus ou leurs crimes, Bruxelles, H. Ode, 1845, tome 9, p. 295-296 [archive]
« Héron », dans Pierre Larousse (dir.), Grand dictionnaire universel du XIXe siècle, Paris, Société Larousse, 1872, tome 9, p. 241 [archive]
« Héron (François) », dans Société des gens de Lettres, Dictionnaire historique, critique et bibliographique, vol. 13, Paris, Ménard & Desenne, 1822, p. 435
Albert Mathiez, « La vie de Héron racontée par lui-même », Annales historiques de la Révolution française, no 11, septembre-octobre 1925, p. 480-483 (lire en ligne [archive]).

French revolutionaries
French police officers
1746 births
1796 deaths
People from Ille-et-Vilaine